The Afghanistan Champions League, previously known as the Afghan Premier League and the  Rahmani Foundation Afghan Premier League for sponsorship reasons, is a professional men's soccer league run by the Afghanistan Football Federation (AFF). It is the country's primary competition for the sport. The competition commenced in September 2012. The league is currently contested by twelve teams. Seasons usually runs from September, followed by final series involving two highest-placed teams in each group. National champion gains qualification into the continental competition, AFC Cup. Most games are played at the Afghanistan Football Federation Stadium in Kabul.

Since the league's inaugural season, a total of three clubs have been crowned Afghan Premier League champions. Shaheen Asmayee, have  a record 6 premier league titles.

History
The League was established in 2012 with the first season running through September and October of that year. 8 teams were concurrently established in 2012 to become the inaugural competitors.

Before 2012, the league in Afghanistan was broken down into 7 groups that covered the country.

Players for the league were selected with the help of a reality television talent show called Maidan e sabz ("The Green Pitch"), helmed by Mokhtar Lashkari, star of Tolo TV, Afghanistan's equivalent of The Oprah Winfrey Show.

The concept came from the Afghanistan Football Federation and the Afghanistan-based MOBY Group, which owns a number of TV channels and radio stations and is the largest media group in the country. MOBY Group channels will broadcast matches. Players were voted onto teams by a jury and by the television audience. The 34 provinces were grouped into eight larger zones. Eight teams of 18 players, one from every region, were formed.

The Afghan High Peace Council has praised the creation and development of the League as an, "opportunity to bring peace and stability" to Afghanistan. The process has given opportunities to minorities such as the Hazara who were treated as an underclass. Many players and supporters have undergone considerable trauma for which the League serves as a form of therapy. Along with the Shpageeza Cricket League which started in 2013, Afghan Premier League football is one of the few big sporting competitions in Afghanistan, offering precious relief from the violence of every day life.

Shaheen Asmayee F.C. have won a record 5 Afghan Premier League titles (2013, 2014, 2016, 2017, 2020). They are the only team to have reached the Afghan Premier League final in eight consecutive seasons (2013–2020).

In 2021, for the first time since the inaugural season, 6 teams instead of 8 are contesting the league due to financial reasons.

Champions

Wins by club

Clubs

2021 season (Safe Cup جام امن)
The following 6 clubs competed in the Premier League during 2021 season. In the 7th and final day of this competition, Shaheen Asmayee defeated Simorgh Alburz 2-0 and won the inaugural and only season of Safe Cup on 11 November, 2021.

Media coverage
Private media group Moby Group has the official rights to cover all matches of the ACL. The matches are aired live on the company's two television channels in Afghanistan, namely TOLO and Lemar, and also offer live commentary on their radio stations, Arman FM and Arakozia FM. Matches are also available live on the league's official YouTube page.

Sponsorship
Roshan Telecom is the title sponsor of Afghan Champions League after which it is named as Roshan Afghan Premier League. Official Partners of Afghan Premier League are Afghanistan International Bank and Hummel International which provided kit for the teams.

See also
Football in Afghanistan

References

External links
RSSSF.com – Afghanistan – List of Champions

 
2012 establishments in Afghanistan
Football leagues in Afghanistan
Top level football leagues in Asia
Sports leagues established in 2012